Dougal is a Scottish masculine given name. It is an Anglicised form of the Scottish Gaelic Dubhghall, or Dùghall. These Gaelic names are composed of the elements: dubh, meaning "black"; and gall, meaning "impostor". The Gaelic names are derived from a byname, said to have referred to a Dane, in contrast to the fairer Norwegians.

Variants of Dougal include: Dugald, and Dugal. A pet form of Dougal is Dougie.

See also 
List of Irish-language given names
Dubgaill and Finngaill

References 

Anglicised Scottish Gaelic-language given names
Scottish masculine given names
Irish masculine given names